Waratah West is a suburb of Newcastle, New South Wales, Australia, located  from Newcastle's central business district. It is part of the City of Newcastle local government area.

History 
The Aboriginal people, in this area, the Awabakal, were the first people of this land.

Today 
Waratah West Public School is a co-ed government primary located on 22 Leonora Parade.

References

Suburbs of Newcastle, New South Wales